The Salokko rat (Taeromys arcuatus) is a species of rodent in the family Muridae.

It is found only in Sulawesi, Indonesia. The Salokko rat has been found in the Mekongga Mountains of southeastern Sulawesi, and Lore Lindu National Park, Central Sulawesi.

References

Taeromys
Rats of Asia
Rodents of Sulawesi
Endemic fauna of Indonesia
Mammals described in 1935
Taxonomy articles created by Polbot